Aleksandr Anatolyevich Tsarenko (born 21 November 1967) is a Russian professional football manager and a former player.

Club career
He made his professional debut in the Soviet Second League in 1989 for FC Zvezda Gorodishche.

Personal life
His son Aleksandr Aleksandrovich Tsarenko also played football professionally.

Honours
 Russian Premier League runner-up: 1993.
 Russian Premier League bronze: 1996.
 Russian Cup finalist: 1995.

European club competitions
With FC Rotor Volgograd.

 UEFA Cup 1994–95: 2 games.
 UEFA Cup 1995–96: 1 game.

References

1967 births
Sportspeople from Volgograd
Living people
Soviet footballers
Russian footballers
Association football midfielders
FC Rotor Volgograd players
FC Tekstilshchik Kamyshin players
FC Tyumen players
FC Lokomotiv Nizhny Novgorod players
FC Olimpia Volgograd players
FC Sodovik Sterlitamak players
Russian Premier League players
Russian football managers